The 1966 Wimbledon Championships took place on the outdoor grass courts at the All England Lawn Tennis and Croquet Club in Wimbledon, London, United Kingdom. The tournament was held from Monday 20 June until Saturday 2 July 1966. It was the 80th staging of the Wimbledon Championships, and the third Grand Slam tennis event of 1966. Manuel Santana and Billie Jean King won the singles titles.

Champions

Seniors

Men's singles

 Manuel Santana defeated  Dennis Ralston, 6–4, 11–9, 6–4

Women's singles

 Billie Jean King defeated  Maria Bueno, 6–3, 3–6, 6–1

Men's doubles

 Ken Fletcher /  John Newcombe defeated  Bill Bowrey /  Owen Davidson, 6–3, 6–4, 3–6, 6–3

Women's doubles

 Maria Bueno /  Nancy Richey defeated  Margaret Smith /  Judy Tegart, 6–3, 4–6, 6–4

Mixed doubles

 Ken Fletcher /  Margaret Smith defeated  Dennis Ralston /  Billie Jean King, 4–6, 6–3, 6–3

Juniors

Boys' singles

 Vladimir Korotkov defeated  Brian Fairlie, 6–3, 11–9

Girls' singles

 Birgitta Lindström defeated  Judy Congdon, 7–5, 6–3

References

External links
 Official Wimbledon Championships website

 
Wimbledon Championships
Wimbledon Championships
Wimbledon Championships
Wimbledon Championships